David Henry Stahl (May 29, 1920 – February 21, 1970) was a United States circuit judge of the United States Court of Appeals for the Third Circuit.

Early life
Born in Ukraine, Stahl received an Artium Baccalaureus degree from University of Pittsburgh in 1942. He received a Bachelor of Laws from University of Pittsburgh School of Law in 1949. He was in the United States Army starting in 1942, achieving the rank of colonel in the reserves. He served as Attorney General of the Commonwealth of Pennsylvania. He was city solicitor of Pittsburgh, Pennsylvania from 1965 to 1968.

Federal judicial service
Stahl was nominated by President Lyndon B. Johnson on August 2, 1968, to the United States Court of Appeals for the Third Circuit, to a new seat created by 82 Stat. 184. He was confirmed by the United States Senate on October 10, 1968, and received his commission on October 11, 1968. He served until his accidental death (at the age of 49) on February 21, 1970, when he was the victim of carbon monoxide poisoning after pulling into the garage of his home.

References

Sources

1920 births
1970 deaths
Judges of the United States Court of Appeals for the Third Circuit
United States court of appeals judges appointed by Lyndon B. Johnson
20th-century American judges
United States Army colonels
Pennsylvania Attorneys General
20th-century American lawyers
University of Pittsburgh alumni
University of Pittsburgh School of Law alumni
Soviet emigrants to the United States
United States Army reservists